PPR may refer to:
 Projection Pursuit Regression, a statistical learning method
 PPR (company) (Pinault-Printemps-Redoute), the previous name of Kering, a French luxury goods and retail distribution company
 Pentatricopeptide repeat, a sequence motif in genetics
 Peste des petits ruminants, or ovine rinderpest (the French initialism is commonly used in English in Africa)
 Philosophy and Phenomenological Research, a bimonthly philosophy journal
 Portland Pattern Repository, a web repository for computer programming design patterns
 Private product remaining, a macroeconomics indicator
 Proper in heraldry
 Polypropylene random copolymer, a plastic used for potable water pipework
 Point per reception, a variant of fantasy US football

Politics and government
 Partido Popular Republicano, a political party in El Salvador
 Partido Progressista Reformador, a Brazilian political party dissolved in 1995
 Pirate Party of Russia
 Policía de Puerto Rico, the Spanish abbreviation for the Puerto Rico Police
 Politieke Partij Radicalen, a Dutch political party
 Polska Partia Robotnicza, the former Polish Workers' Party
 Puerto Ricans for Puerto Rico Party (Partido Puertorriqueños por Puerto Rico)
 Romanian Popular Party, a Moldovan political party
 Polish People's Republic, a Warsaw Pact member that existed from 1947 to 1989